The 2004 Durand Cup Final was the 117th final of the Durand Cup, the oldest football competition in India, and was contested between Kolkata giants East Bengal and Mohun Bagan on 10 November 2004 at the Ambedkar Stadium in Delhi.

East Bengal won the final 2–1 to claim their 16th Durand Cup title. Captain Chandan Das scored a brace for East Bengal including a last minute winner as East Bengal won the title.

Route to the final

East Bengal

East Bengal entered the 2004 Durand Cup as one of the National Football League teams and the runner-up from the previous season. They were allocated into Group B alongside Army XI and Sporting Club de Goa. In the opening game East Bengal defeated Army XI 3–1. Paulo Roberto da Silva scored a brace and Chandan Das scored the other for East Bengal. In the second game, East Bengal defeated Sporting Club de Goa 4–0 as Ernest Jeremiah scored a debut hattrick and Chandan Das scored the other as East Bengal topped the group and reached the last four. In the semi-final, East Bengal defeated JCT 1–0 with Syed Rahim Nabi scoring the solitary goal as East Bengal reached their third consecutive Durand Cup final.

Mohun Bagan

Mohun Bagan entered the 2004 Durand Cup as one of the National Football League teams and were allocated into Group C alongside State Bank of Travancore and Assam Rifles. In the opening game, Mohun Bagan defeated Assam Rifles 5–0 as Sunil Chhetri scored a brace while Mehtab Hossain, Eduardo and Dharamjit Singh scored the other three. In the second match, Mohun Bagan defeated State Bank of Travancore 3–1. Noel Wilson, Mehtab Hossain and Eduardo scored for Bagan as they topped the group and reached the last four. In the semi-final, Mohun Bagan defeated the defending champions Salgaocar 5–4 in penalty shootout after the game ended goalless after added extra time as Mohun Bagan reached the finals.

Match

Details

See also
 Durand Cup 2004, rsssf.com
 117th Durand Cup 2004, indianfootball.de

References

Durand Cup finals
2004–05 in Indian football
East Bengal Club matches
Mohun Bagan AC matches